Professor Douglas Forbes Brewer (22 May 1925 – 16 July 2018) was a Welsh experimental physicist at the University of Sussex, known for his work in cryogenics.

References

1925 births
2018 deaths
Academics of the University of Sussex
Experimental physicists
Cryogenics
People educated at The Crypt School, Gloucester
Scientists from Cardiff
Welsh physicists
Alumni of the University of Oxford
General Electric people